Luigi Alidosi (also Ludovico, died 1430) was the lord of Imola (as Papal vicar) from 1391 until 1424, the last ruler of the city from his family. He was the son of Bertrando Alidosi.

During the Wars in Lombardy, his city was attacked by Filippo Maria Visconti's army, and he was taken captive to Milan. When he was freed after the end of the conflict, Imola had been acquired by the Papal States: he therefore became a Cistercian monk, and died in Rome in 1430.

1430 deaths
Luigi
Lords of Imola
Year of birth unknown